Time Ace is an aerial combat game developed for the Nintendo DS by Trainwreck Studios and The Farm 51 and published by Konami. The game was released on June 12, 2007. Time Ace is based on the concept that an eccentric inventor from 1914, Dr. Hugo Clock, has formed a plan to travel forward in time to end World War I, but the evil Dr. Klaus Scythe uses the time machine to further his own plan for world domination.  The player's goal is to stop Scythe's scheme.

The game is similar in concept to Konami's 1981 arcade game Time Pilot.

Story
In 1914, eccentric scientist Dr. Hugo Clock created a time machine with the plans of going back in time and preventing World War I from happening and preventing millions of needless deaths. However, his sneaky assistant, Dr. Klaus Scythe, hijacks his time machine with a plan to acquire an arsenal of history's most powerful weapons in order to rule the world.

Reception

Time Ace received mixed reviews from critics upon release. On Metacritic, the game holds a score of 52/100 based on 19 reviews, indicating "mixed or average reviews".

References

2007 video games
2015, Inc. games
The Farm 51 games
Konami games
Multiplayer and single-player video games
Nintendo DS games
Nintendo DS-only games
North America-exclusive video games
Video games about time travel
Video games developed in Poland
Video games developed in the United States